The 2020 Tennessee State Tigers football team represented Tennessee State University in the 2020–21 NCAA Division I FCS football season. They were led by eleventh-year head coach Rod Reed and played their home games at Hale Stadium. They competed as a member of the Ohio Valley Conference.

Previous season

The Tigers finished the 2019 season 3–9, 2–6 in OVC play to finish in a tie for seventh place.

Schedule
Tennessee State had games scheduled against Southern on September 5, and Jackson State on September 12, which were later canceled before the start of the 2020 season.

References

Tennessee State
Tennessee State Tigers football seasons
Tennessee State Tigers football